Gradski Stadium Kumanovo  (Gradski stadion Kumanovo) is a multi-purpose stadium in Kumanovo, Republic of North Macedonia. It is used mostly for football matches and is the home stadium of FK Kumanovo and FK Goblen. It holds 2,000 people.

Plans for reconstruction and expansion
The candidate for mayor of Kumanovo in March 2012 local elections Zoran Gjorgjievski together with Lazar Popovski director of Agency for youth and sport promised reconstruction of the stadium if voters will elect Zoran, he was not elected and reconstruction did not take place.

International fixtures

References

External links
Macedonian Football 
Football Federation of North Macedonia 

Football venues in North Macedonia
FK Kumanovo
Stadium
Buildings and structures in Kumanovo
Multi-purpose stadiums in North Macedonia
Sport in Kumanovo